Gaidropsarus is a genus of lotid fishes, with these currently recognized species:
 Gaidropsarus argentatus (J. C. H. Reinhardt, 1837) (Arctic rockling)
 Gaidropsarus biscayensis (Collett, 1890) (Mediterranean bigeye rockling)
 Gaidropsarus capensis (Kaup, 1858) (Cape rockling)
 Gaidropsarus ensis (J. C. H. Reinhardt, 1837) (threadfin rockling)
 Gaidropsarus granti (Regan, 1903) (Azores rockling)
 Gaidropsarus guttatus (Collett, 1890)
 Gaidropsarus insularum Sivertsen, 1945 (comb rockling)
 Gaidropsarus macrophthalmus (Günther, 1867) (bigeye rockling)
 Gaidropsarus mediterraneus (Linnaeus, 1758) (shore rockling)
 Gaidropsarus novaezealandiae (Hector, 1874) (New Zealand ling)
 Gaidropsarus pacificus (Temminck & Schlegel, 1846)
 Gaidropsarus pakhorukovi Shcherbachev, 1995
 Gaidropsarus parini Svetovidov (ru), 1986
 Gaidropsarus vulgaris (Cloquet, 1824) (three-bearded rockling)

The generic name derives from the Ancient Greek roots γῆ (gē, earth); υδρο- (hydro-, "water"); and ψαρός (psaros, "speckled").

References

 
Lotidae
Taxa named by Constantine Samuel Rafinesque
Marine fish genera